Chenoanas is an extinct genus of duck from Eurasia. It is known from three species, C. sansaniensis, C. deserta and C. asiatica. The latter two species were named by Nikita Zelenkov.

See also
2018 in paleontology

References

Anatidae
Fossil taxa described in 2012
Neogene birds of Asia